The Devil's Doorway is a 2018 Irish found footage horror film directed by Aislinn Clarke.

Synopsis
In the early 1960s, two Irish Catholic priests, Father Riley and Father Thornton, are sent to investigate an alleged miracle reported at a Magdalene Asylum run by an order of nuns. However, the priests soon discover something horrible and sinister about the place. The concept of the film is that Father Thornton, as part of his work for the Vatican, recorded his investigation with his camera to document both the review process and the possible evidence, and the film we see is simply the footage shot by him, which has been hidden in the Holy See until now.

Plot
In October 1960, a Vatican bishop, having received a letter and two photographs, instructed two priests to visit a Magdalene Asylum in Ireland, where a statue of the Virgin Mary is said to be bleeding from the eyes in the chapel. Of the two priests, Father Thomas Riley is the older, and is disillusioned in his work as a miracle investigator for the Vatican, complaining that he has seen too many frauds over the years, while the younger Father John Thornton is a priest enthusiastic about the assignment, and fervently believes that they will find a genuine miracle. The authoritarian Mother Superior of the asylum initially tries to discredit the letter (which had been sent anonymously from her hospice) by reminding the priests that "they are not all good girls in this home" and makes it clear that none of the priests are welcome, treats them grudgingly, and installs them in separate accommodation in the building.

To begin the work of documenting the alleged miracle, Father John sets up his film crew (16 mm cameras) in the chapel where the statue reported to have wept blood is located. Upon examining the statue, Father Thomas comments that he cannot analyse the blood, as it has dried up, and he needs a fresh blood sample, so they will have to wait for the miracle or phenomenon to happen again. Meanwhile, the young priest tries to interview some of the women in the asylum, but soon discovers that they have no access to the chapel and are in fact victims of cruel punishments imposed to ensure discipline, and are also exploited for labour, as they are responsible for both keeping the asylum clean and running the local laundry business. The abuse of the hard-working inmates is discussed with the Reverend Mother. Despite being unhappy that the priests have to document all their activities and conversations, she defiantly replies that the Church usually sends them into every dirty secret in the country, and they have had to deal with that ... and adds, "Do you know how many Church messes I've had to personally clean up? How many of the babies born here had fathers who were fathers?"

For two nights, Father John is constantly awakened at 3 a.m., as he hears strange sounds and has apparent visions of children playing in the hallways. He brings this to the attention of Thomas, who denies hearing anything at all. They also confirm that there are no children living in the asylum; the children's wing has been closed since the war. Father Thomas's long-standing doubts about miracles and human evil keep him convinced that a con man is behind these strange occurrences. However, on the third day, all the statues of the Virgin Mary in the asylum begin to bleed at the same time. Father Thomas analyses the blood and discovers that it is human, type O-negative, and that it comes from a pregnant woman. Father Thomas compares the samples with the blood of the inmates and the nuns, but finds no match.

A nun privately confesses that she was the person who contacted the Church to investigate the weeping statue. The nun warns Father Thomas that there is a young pregnant woman named Kathleen O'Brien being held in a secret room in the basement, and recites, "If your eye makes you sin, pluck it out and throw it away". Despite the Mother Superior's stern objections, Father Thomas insists on seeing Kathleen. Father Thomas demands Kathleen's release when he sees her emaciated, scarred and chained in a filthy room. A local doctor confirms that the girl is a virgin, but that she is pregnant, and in his experience, he cannot explain how it happened. Attempts to move her beyond her room result in violent attacks and soon manifestations of apparent demonic possession. Father Thomas interviews Kathleen, who claims to be possessed by an unknown entity. Kathleen says something to Father Thomas in Greek. The priest attempts to pray with Kathleen, which causes a nearby nun to suddenly experience intense pain.

All the statues of the Virgin Mary in the building are suddenly broken. Father Thomas and Father John follow a ghostly apparition downstairs to a room that houses a satanic cult, and items found in the room indicate that a Black Mass has been performed. Father Thomas fetches Mother Superior to take her with him into the room, only to find that all evidence of the Black Mass ritual has inexplicably vanished. As they try to rationalise what has just happened, screams are heard from Kathleen's cell, who is stabbing her belly. Father Thomas intervenes and in attempting the ritual exorcism, Kathleen levitates from her bed and her hand also bursts into flames during another instance of supernatural activity. In response to what Kathleen told him in Greek, Father Thomas confesses to Father John that he was an orphan; furthermore, Father Thomas speculates that he may have been born in that very asylum. Kathleen cryptically says something to the priests about the babies who have been killed in the asylum. "The babies down there are suffering for the sins of others." Father Thomas questions Mother Superior about false records of missing children. Mother Superior explains that she sold the babies to fund the asylum. Kathleen goes into labour. The nuns attend the birth while the priests go in search of the doctor. Kathleen dies in childbirth.

Father Thomas and Father John follow the apparitions of more ghostly children throughout the building. The two priests return to the room where they had found Satanic paraphernalia, as they hear a baby crying. There they find a murdered nun, whose eyes have been gouged out; she is the one who had previously confessed to sending the letter. They then discover a secret passage leading to a network of tunnels where they discover several skeletons of small children. The two priests walk through the tunnels, but become disoriented and are separated when a nun attacks them. Father John is killed by the nun. After taping a confessional, Father Thomas finds a satanic altar where a baby used to be. The priest encounters a group of nuns who form a coven and are performing a ritual. Showing signs of possession, Mother Superior says, "Welcome home, Thomas" and suddenly attacks the priest. After Father Thomas falls, Mother Superior is heard shushing a crying baby.

Cast
Lalor Roddy as Father Thomas Riley.
Ciaran Flynn as Father John Thornton.
Helena Bereen as Mother Superior. 
Lauren Coe as Kathleen. 
Dearbhail Lynch as Eileen Murphy
Carleen Melaugh as Sister Maria Louise

Production
Clarke stated in an interview that she was wanted to publicise the horrors of the Magdalene Laundries in Ireland, saying: "“I had my son when I was 17, which was the year after the last Magdalene Laundry closed. People think these places existed a very long time ago, but that was 1997; the last one had closed in 1996. I was 17 and unmarried, I could have been in one if the circumstances has been different". She stated that Magdalence laundries where women were essentially worked as slave labour for the Catholic Church were not an aberration in Irish life, saying: "Everyone knew. So you had no where to turn. Every person was complicit in a way, because everybody knew that they were there and what was happening. So girls could be plucked out of schools and sent to these places. That was the direct result of the Catholic Church apparatus, which created a situation where vulnerable people could be exploited for so long".

In another interview, Clarke stated: "The Magdalene laundries are only one aspect of the terrible things that happened in Irish Catholic society. They were symptoms of the church/state apparatus, the combination of the two things created the mechanism. That's part of what the film is about for me: even if Lalor [Roddy] as Father Thomas wants to be a good priest and a good man, and that's what he wants to be, that's impossible within this system and within this society. It's the same with the nuns. Not all the nuns are bad - there is the good nun who sends the letter out, and she does want to do right by her faith - but everyone becomes a cog in the greater mechanism, and no one person can really make any huge changes."

Clarke, who lives in Northern Ireland and is active in the theater, recruited most of the actors from her own work in the theater. About the casting of Roddy in the lead role, Clarke said: "Lalor, who plays the lead Father Thomas, is the only one who didn't come through the process. We had been looking to cast a little younger, but, somehow, the script had fallen into his hands and he just got in touch and asked to read for it, having seen the script somewhere. I invited him to my office, he auditioned there and then and he was Father Thomas. Lalor had lived through all the social upheaval in Ireland through the sixties and seventies and was full of the righteous anger that the project needed. Like Helena, he was just perfect off the bat".

About the filming, Clarke stated: "The whole experience was different. I'd made shorts before and I've worked in theatre a lot, but making a feature is different. We had about 16 days to shoot, on a tiny budget, very little lead-in or development time — we just had to do it. The sort of all-encompassing focus that helps you work through so many consecutive hours, with little-to-no sleep, and leading a team of a dozens of people is an intense feeling. But I learned that this is where I thrive. In fact, I learned that the set is my favorite place to be and I can't wait to get on to the next one". She was stated that expensive productions like Game of Thrones that had been filmed in Ulster had vastly improved the technical skills of film crews in Northern Ireland, making it possible despite the film's low budget to bring in a very polished and professional production. Roddy himself appeared in the first season of Game of Thrones in the second episode The Kingsroad as the assassin who tries to kill Bran Stark.

Reviews
Jacob Knight gave the film a favorable review, calling it "pretty damn good" and especially praised Clarke's direction, which he called very skillful. Anya Stanley wrote in her review: "What sets The Devil’s Doorway apart is its indictment of systematic Church atrocities, of the sins of a nation’s past coming back to torment them, personified in the violated body of an innocent girl and her unborn, unwanted child. Sure, it gets tiresome to see the crosses flip upside down and the body contortion, right on cue. But the grand socio-political designs embroidered into these cinematic banalities makes their usage ultimately forgivable and interesting." Stanely praised Clarke for her "sense of craft" and her focus on what the characters can hear instead of what they can see. Shannon McGrew wrote "...Aislinn Clarke does a brilliant job of crafting a taunt horror film from the perspective of Father John. What I truly loved about this film, though, is not just the found-footage angle, but the true stories surrounding Magdalene Laundries. I’ll be honest, I knew nothing of these Laundries prior to watching the film and am now horrified by the treatments that were allowed to be executed by these nuns with the support of the Roman Catholic Church."

Tracy Palmer wrote; "The real history of the film serves the story well as the concept itself for the homes and the facts that have emerged are the stuff of nightmares.  Magdalene Laundries or Magdalene Asylums were essentially work prisons disguised as “treatment” centers for prostitutes, promiscuous women, and single pregnant women.  They were harsh to say the least and the conditions were unbearable...This simple backdrop should be terrifying enough for any women and I'm quite frankly shocked we haven't seen more movies about these terrible places.  Toss in some good acting, Sixties era film work and an interesting story and we have a compelling and terrifying feature film". Eva Tushnet in the Jesuit journal America praised the film's atmosphere, writing: "What is so awful about a place like this one is its institutional power, its inescapable control of every vista, the sheer weight it brings to bear on the girls caught within it." Tushnet concluded her review: "Toward the end of the film, we see several people receive last rites. In a way this entire film, made by a woman raised Catholic but no longer a believer, is an attempt to give blessing and burial to the real women who died without acknowledgment of their suffering." Fionnuala Halligan praised Clarke's direction in her feature film debut together with the acting, which she argued compensated for the film's low budget. Halligan wrote that the film's settling against the background of the real horrors of the Magdalence laundries gave it a vividness and a sadness that it otherwise would have lacked.

Jason Best wrote in a review: "Pulsing with indignation at clerical hypocrisy, director Aislinn Clarke’s film won’t convert any found-footage sceptics, but it is a distinct cut above the low-budget genre’s usual fare thanks to its careful craft and strong performances, particularly Roddy’s." Nick Johnston praised Clarke for her film, saying it would bring welcome attention to the Magdalence laundries, writing: "It’s a dynamic setting for a horror film, and Clarke’s skillful direction and palpable sympathy for these women prevents The Devil’s Doorway from falling down an exploitation black hole (not that it would have been a bad thing, necessarily)." David Prendeville praised the film, writing: "The decision to shoot on 16mm film rather than replicating the era digitally creates an evocative and eerie aesthetic, as well as adding a further layer of authenticity to the picture...Smart in both form and content, this is an innovative, effective and necessary Irish horror film. It marks Clarke out as a distinctive talent to watch." Patrick Bromley wrote: "...it was hard to shake the feeling that the movie plays like a collection of Horror’s Greatest Hits. Found footage? Check. Demonic possession? Check. Creepy nuns? Check. Children’s laughter? Check. Loud noises? Check. That it’s packaged all up in a single film couldn’t quite outweigh the fact that it’s all been done before. But here’s the thing: it’s all done very well. If you are someone who likes the found footage aesthetic and/or is creeped out by religious horror, there’s a very strong chance that The Devil’s Doorway will play like gangbusters."

Marisa Mirabal wrote in her review: "Clarke shines light on a malignant history through captivating storytelling that appears to be seasoned instead of the work of a first-time director. She possesses a strength for scares rooted in realism but also in cinematic language that translates on screen through her craft. The horror genre is blessed to welcome another innovative female director who is telling stories and rebelling against the traditional gaze–pushing the envelope and experimenting in true artistic fashion." Kat Hughes wrote in her review: "An inspired entry into the found footage genre with The Devil’s Doorway, Clarke proves that you don’t have to stick to digital to achieve greatness. Easily one of the most authentic found footage films that we’ve seen since The Blair Witch Project, we look forward to seeing what Clarke brings us next."

By contrast, Noel Murray in The LA Times argued that the film through innovative in some respects and well acted was heavily clichéd and ultimately unimaginative. Frank Scheck wrote: "The well documented infamies of Ireland's Magdalene Laundries would seem to hold diabolically effective potential for a horror film. Unfortunately, the best that director Aislinn Clarke can do is this derivative found-footage chiller". Jeannette Catsoulis wrote a negative review in The New York Times: "Wielding mostly 16-millimeter film, the director of photography, Ryan Kernaghan, mimics the home movies of the time with flickering ellipses and flares of dazzling, burned-out white. Some of his images, like one of sweating young women scrubbing sheets in a haze of boiling steam, are quite beautiful. Yet despite its brief running time, the movie feels dragged out; like the priests, it will eventually lose its way."

In a negative review, Brandon Schreur wrote: "Nothing in this movie is actually scary. It’s all a bunch of clichés and jump scares that don’t have the lasting impression that director Aislinn Clarke thinks they’re going to have. You’ve seen everything in The Devil’s Doorway done before, and you’ve seen it done a lot better." Likewise, David Day in his review called the film "pretty forgettable". Jamie Righetti wrote :"The Devil’s Doorway doesn’t bring any new tricks to the genre, relying instead on the usual possession film and found footage film scare techniques. However, its exploration of Ireland’s dark history helps it stand out from the pack, and it’s just the latest example of women directors making headway in the horror genre".

References

External links
The Devil's Doorway at Rotten Tomatoes

2018 films
2018 horror films
Irish horror films
English-language Irish films
Films set in Ireland
Found footage films
Films about religion
Religious horror films
Films critical of the Catholic Church
Films about Catholic nuns
Media coverage of Catholic Church sexual abuse scandals
Feminism and the arts
Feminism and history
Films about sexual repression
2010s English-language films